Mahir Agva (born 26 June 1996) is a Turkish-German professional basketball player for Galatasaray Nef of the Turkish Basketbol Süper Ligi (BSL) and the Basketball Champions League. Standing at 6 ft 9 in (2.06 m), he plays at the center position.

Professional career
Mahir Agva played basketball professionally in Germany for seven seasons. After spending the first years of his career between the ProA and the Basketball Bundesliga, he consistently played in the Basketball Bundesliga for three seasons between 2016 and 2019. In these seven years he played for clubs such as Tigers Tübingen, Ehingen Urspring, the Frankfurt Skyliners and the Gießen 46ers.

Darüşşafaka
On July 11, 2019, Agva signed with Darüşşafaka of the Basketbol Süper Ligi (BSL).

Pınar Karşıyaka
On August 20, 2020, Agva signed a two-year deal with Pınar Karşıyaka of the Basketbol Süper Ligi (BSL).

Galatasaray Nef
On June 26, 2022, he has signed with Galatasaray Nef of the Turkish Basketbol Süper Ligi (BSL).

References

External links
Real GM Profile
German Basketball Federation Profile
Eurobasket.com Profile
TBLStat.net Player Profile

1996 births
Living people
Centers (basketball)
Darüşşafaka Basketbol players
German men's basketball players
German people of Turkish descent
Giessen 46ers players
Karşıyaka basketball players
People from Reutlingen
Sportspeople from Tübingen (region)
Skyliners Frankfurt players
Tigers Tübingen players
Galatasaray S.K. (men's basketball) players